is a national highway of Japan connecting Nara, Nara and Matsusaka, Mie in Japan, with a total length of 122.3 km (75.99 mi).

References

National highways in Japan
Roads in Mie Prefecture
Roads in Nara Prefecture